Three highways in the U.S. state of California have been signed as Route 80:
 Interstate 80 in California, part of the Interstate Highway System, with the westernmost segment being a state highway.
 Interstate 80 Business (Sacramento, California)
 U.S. Route 80 in California (1928-1964)